Wedding in Malinovka (Svadba v Malinovke) is a 1967 Soviet musical comedy film directed by Andrei Tutyshkin based on an operetta by Boris Aleksandrov adapted by Leonid Yukhvid.

The film is about a Ukrainian village during the time of the Russian Civil War. With power alternating almost daily between Soviet and Ukrainian nationalist forces, the villagers of Malinovka are never sure who is in charge, so they modify their behaviour and dress accordingly.

Cast 
 Vladimir Samoilov as Nazar Duma, Red squadron commander
 Lyudmila Alfimova as Sofya (vocals — Valentina Levko)
 Valentina Lysenko as Yarinka
 Yevgeni Lebedev as Nechipor
 Zoya Fyodorova as Gorpina Dormidontovna
 Heliy Sysoyev as Andreyka (vocal — Mikhail Egorov)
 Mikhail Pugovkin as Yashka the Gunner
 Nikolai Slichenko as Petrya
 Grigori Abrikosov as Grytsko Balyasny, or Pan-Ataman Gritsian Tavrichesky. 
 Andrei Abrikosov as Balyasny Senior
 Mikhail Vodyanoy as Popandopulo
 Tamara Nosova as Komarikha
 Emma Treyvas as Tryndychikha
 Aleksei Smirnov as Smetana
 Margarita Krinitsyna
 Aleksandr Orlov as priest
 Lyubov Tishchenko
 Aleksandr Zakharov
 Vyacheslav Voronin as Chechil
 N. Kogan
 B. Moreno
 A. Pishvanov
 Yu. Shepelev

Dance scenes were cast with the participation of the Moldovan dance troupe Joc.

Cultural influence 
One of the film's main characters, Nazar Duma, has a completely unrelated namesake in a different famous Soviet film, Tractor Drivers (1939). This coincidence was used in a crossover parody film, Tractor Drivers 2.

References

External links

1967 films
1967 in the Soviet Union
Lenfilm films
1967 musical comedy films
1960s Russian-language films
Films set in the Soviet Union
Soviet musical comedy films
Russian musical comedy films
Films based on operettas
Russian Civil War films